Franco Ayunta (born 29 November 2002) is an Argentine footballer currently playing as a forward for Temperley.

Career statistics

Club

References

2002 births
Living people
Argentine footballers
Association football forwards
Primera Nacional players
Club Atlético Temperley footballers